John Michael White (born June 10, 1981) is a Canadian film, television and commercial actor. He is best known for his portrayal of Erik Stifler in American Pie Presents: The Naked Mile (2006) and its sequel American Pie Presents: Beta House (2007).

Career

He began acting during the mid-1990s, appearing on the television series Goosebumps, in The Cuckoo Clock of Doom and The Haunted Mask II episodes, and on The Adventures of Shirley Holmes, among others.  John also began to appear in various TV movies and commercials during this time in his career, while still living in Toronto, Ontario.  After moving to Los Angeles, John began to appear in higher profile projects, most notably for his role as Erik Stifler in American Pie Presents: The Naked Mile and American Pie Presents: Beta House.  He also appeared in the made-for-TV movie She's Too Young, along with the films How to Deal starring Mandy Moore, and Wild Cherry alongside Kristin Cavallari.  John has also guest-starred on the CBS drama, Cold Case. In April 2011, he portrayed the youthful John F. Kennedy in the television miniseries, The Kennedys, airing on ReelzChannel and History Television.

John shoot the 2nd season of the HBO series Good Dog, which aired in 2012.

He continues to live and work in Los Angeles, California.

Personal life

John has a brother, Kevin, and two sisters, Andrea, and Stephanie.

Filmography

Television

References

External links

www.thejohnwhite.com
ICM

1981 births
Living people
Male actors from Toronto
Canadian male film actors
Canadian male television actors